The sixth season of  Law & Order aired on NBC between September 20, 1995, and May 22, 1996.

Cast
Rey Curtis (played by Benjamin Bratt) replaced season five's Mike Logan (Chris Noth) in the role of Junior Detective. This change left District Attorney Adam Schiff (played by Steven Hill) as the only remaining member of the series' cast from the first season. Hill was not an original member of the cast, as his character replaced District Attorney Alfred Wentworth (played by Roy Thinnes) from the original pilot, "Everyone's Favorite Bagman". Paul Robinette (played by original cast member Richard Brooks) returns in the episode "Custody", his first guest appearance since his departure after season three.

Main cast
 Jerry Orbach as Senior Detective Lennie Briscoe
 Benjamin Bratt as Junior Detective Rey Curtis
 S. Epatha Merkerson as Lieutenant Anita Van Buren
 Sam Waterston as Executive Assistant District Attorney Jack McCoy
 Jill Hennessy as Assistant District Attorney Claire Kincaid
 Steven Hill as District Attorney Adam Schiff

Recurring cast
 Richard Brooks as Defense Attorney Paul Robinette
 Carolyn McCormick as Dr. Elizabeth Olivet

Departure of Jill Hennessy
Jill Hennessy, who played Assistant District Attorney Claire Kincaid, left the series at the end of the 6th season. Richard Brooks, as Paul Robinette, returns in the episode "Custody", having his first guest appearance after his departure from the series at the end of the 3rd season.

Episodes

References

External links
 Episode guide from NBC.com

06
1995 American television seasons
1996 American television seasons